The Battle of Nadaun, alternatively known as the Hussaini Yudh, was fought at Nadaun, between Raja Bhim Chand of Bilaspur (Kahlur) and the Mughals under Alif Khan. Bhim Chand was supported by Guru Gobind Singh (the tenth Sikh Guru) and the Mughals were supported by other hill chieftains, notably Kirpal Chand from Kangra and Dayal Chand from Bijharwal. Bhim Chand and some hill chieftains, after conclusion of Battle of Bhangani had refused to pay tribute to the Mughal emperor which led to the battle at Nadaun. The battle resulted in the victory of Bilaspur State and Sikh alliance.

Different authors give the date of the battle variously as 1687, 1689, 1690, 20 March 1691, and 4 April 1691.

Bichitra Natak, considered to be the autobiography of Guru Gobind Singh, is one of the major sources of information about the battle. However, its authorship is disputed by some scholars.

Cause
The Mughal emperor Aurangzeb's Deccan campaigns against Bijapur and Golconda had put considerable strain on the Mughal exchequer. To meet these expenses, Aurangazeb ordered the Governor of Punjab, Azim Khan, to recover annual tributes from the rulers of hill states, who had been defaulting on the payment for three consecutive years.

Azim Khan assigned the duty of collecting tributes to Mian Khan, the viceroy of Jammu. The duty of collecting tributes from Kangra and adjoining principalities was assigned to Alif Khan (or Alaf Khan).

Alif Khan first approached Raja Kirpal Chand (or Bhim Chand Katoch) of Kangra. The Raja told him that Raja Bhim Chand of Bilaspur (Kahlur) was the most powerful king in the region; if he pays tribute, the others will follow. Raja Dayal of Bijarwal (or Bijharwal) was persuaded by Kirpal to meet Alif Khan's demands. At Raja Kirpal's suggestion, Alif Khan proceeded towards Bhim Chand's capital. He halted at Nadaun and sent his envoy to Bhim Chand of Bilaspur with his demands. However, Bhim Chand refused to pay the tribute.

Raja Bhim Chand of Bilaspur formed an alliance with the rest of the hill Rajas, and also sought the support of Guru Gobind Singh. The Guru, who was against the idea of paying tributes to the Mughals, decided to support Bhim Chand.

Description in Bichitra Natak
The author of Bichitra Natak states that Bhim Chand was aided by Raj Singh, Ram Singh, Sukhdev Gaji of Jasrot, and Prithi Chand of Dadhwal, among others. He also states that the Rajputs of the Nanglua and Panglu tribes, and the soldiers of Jaswar and Guler, also participated in the battle. The Mughal forces were led by Hussain Khan.

Initially, the forces of Kirpal Chand overpowered Bhim Chand's forces. Then, Bhim Chand recited Hanuman mantras, and called all his allies, including the Guru. As the combined forces launched an attack, the enemy forces of Raja Dayal of Bijharwal and Raja Kirpal also advanced. In the ensuing battle, the forces of Mughals and Kirpal Chand were driven out into the river. Alif Khan and his warriors fled away.

Aftermath
Soon after the battle, Chand patched up his quarrel with the Mughal faujdar and agreed to pay tribute to them. Guru Gobind Singh reacted to this by plundering a village in his territory.

According to Bichitra Natak, Guru Gobind Singh remained at Nadaun, on the banks of the River Beas, for eight more days, and visited the places of all the chiefs. Later, both the parties made an agreement and peace was established.

Later, Maharaja Ranjit Singh built a gurdwara on the spot where the Guru had pitched his tent. The Gurdwara was affiliated to Shiromani Gurdwara Prabandhak Committee in 1935. It is known as Gurudwara Dasvin Patshahi  or Gurdwara Nadaun Sahib.

References

External links
 Description of the Battle of Bhangani in Bichitra Natak (Chapter 9).

Naduan
Battles involving the Rajputs
Nadaun, Battle of
History of Himachal Pradesh
17th century in India
17th-century conflicts
1691 in India
1687 in India